The Aughrim River flows from confluence of the Derry Water and River Ow south of the village of Aughrim in County Wicklow in Ireland. It flows in a generally easterly direction for approximately  following the R747 regional road for its full length before joining  the River Avoca in the Vale of Avoca, which in turn discharges into the Irish Sea at Arklow. From source to sea the river remains in East Wicklow.

The R747 crosses the river twice, near Aughrim and downstream at the village of Woodenbridge, before the Aughrim discharges into the Avoca river.

See also
Rivers of Ireland

References

Rivers of County Wicklow